The following highways are numbered 655:

United States

Canada
 Alberta Highway 655
 Saskatchewan Highway 655